Arthur Rayner Pardington (July 30, 1862 – July 28, 1915) was the chief engineer and 2nd Vice President of the Long Island Motor Parkway, Inc., which oversaw the building and development of the parkway. He was also the vice president and general manager of the Lincoln Highway Association and organized the Long Island Automobile Club.

Early life and family
He was born on July 30, 1862, in Saginaw, Michigan, to the Rev. Dr. Rayner Stevens Pardington (1836–1906) and Elizabeth Jane Cory Pardington (1840–1916). Later in life, he lived on Long Island and was a resident of Smithtown, New York. On November 10, 1887, in Tecumseh, Michigan, he married Gertrude Dora Hause (1864–1894), with whom he had a daughter Dorothy Gertrude Pardington. Widowed, he then married Lucile Fatima Crosley (1866–1943) on March 15, 1889, in Franklin, Ohio. He had two children from the second marriage, Janet Lucille Pardington (1899–1991) and Ruth Crosley Pardington (1900–1983). His brother was the Rev. Dr. George Palmer Pardington of the Nyack Institute.

Racing enthusiast
Pardington was an avid racing enthusiast, serving as vice president of the AAA racing division. Early races were often on local roads. When the deaths that occurred from over-eager spectators encroaching on the roadways threatened to close down the sport altogether, Pardington got involved with limited access projects like the Long Island Motor Parkway as a safer alternative. In 1911 he was the referee for the first Indianapolis 500.

The Long Island Motor Parkway
Pardington was instrumental in promoting the Long Island Motor Parkway and, on June 6, 1908, hosted an official ceremony for the commencement of the parkway's construction. In his speech at the ceremony, he said:

Think of the time it will save the busy man of affairs, who likes to crowd into each day a bit of relaxation. He will leave downtown at three o'clock in the afternoon, take the subway to a garage within striking distance of the new Blackwell's Island-East River Bridge. In twenty minutes a 60-horse-power car will have him at the western terminus of the motor parkway. Here a card of admission passes him through the gates, speed limits are left behind, the great white way is before him, and with throttle open he can go, go, go and keep going fifty, sixty or ninety miles an hour until Riverhead or Southampton is reached.

He was also responsible for the first Vanderbilt Cup race on Long Island and for William K. Vanderbilt II's donation of the competition's trophy. Besides Vanderbilt, he also acted as a referee of the race.

Lincoln Highway
Based on his success with realizing the Long Island Motor Parkway, Pardington was invited to work on the Lincoln Highway and served as its vice president and general manager. He died while working on this project.

Death
He died in Detroit on July 28, 1915. He was 52 years old. He is interred in the Woodlawn Cemetery in Detroit.

References

External links
 Find a Grave
 Pardington, A. R., "Modern Appian Way for the Motorist." Harper's Weekly 51 (March 16, 1907): 390–2. 

1862 births
1915 deaths
Engineers from New York (state)
People from Smithtown, New York
People from Saginaw, Michigan
People from Wayne County, Michigan
Burials at Woodlawn Cemetery (Detroit)